Until My Death might refer to one of the following:
An album from the American rapper Webbie
An album from the American rapper Quan